Tore Ljungqvist (21 April 1905 – 27 January 1980) was a Swedish water polo player who competed in the 1936 Summer Olympics. In 1936 he was part of the Swedish team which finished seventh in the water polo tournament. He played six matches.

References

1905 births
1980 deaths
Swedish male water polo players
Olympic water polo players of Sweden
Water polo players at the 1936 Summer Olympics